The Berman Brothers are the record production duo of siblings Frank and Christian Berman.

In 2006, they created and co-produced the album Rhythms del Mundo, which fused an all-star cast of Cuban musicians including Ibrahim Ferrer and Omara Portuondo of the Buena Vista Social Club with US and UK artists such as U2, Coldplay, Sting, Jack Johnson, Maroon 5, Arctic Monkeys, Franz Ferdinand, Kaiser Chiefs and others. Rhythms del Mundo was released in over 61 countries and received multiple sales awards. The project is in aid of Artists Project Earth (APE), which lends support for natural disaster relief and climate change awareness.

The Berman Brothers' musical achievements include the prestigious Grammy Award for the Baha Men's "Who Let the Dogs Out" in 2001. They were also honored by Billboard magazine in its "Billboard of the Year Issue,". They have created remixes for the platinum selling group Real McCoy (M.C. Sar & The Real McCoy) and have produced records for renowned artists such as Hanson, Baha Men, Sophie B Hawkins. 
 
In 2014, the Bermans released an album titled Studio Rio Presents: The Brazil Connection which sets the music of jazz classics to samba and bossa nova arrangements. This Album features artists like Billie Holiday, Marvin Gaye, Aretha Franklin, Nina Simone and Sly & The Family Stone. The Studio Rio version of "It's Your Thing" by The Isley Brothers was featured on the 2014 Fifa World Cup Album One Love, One Rhythm. The song was also used during the ESPN soccer World Cup coverage.

Their music is featured in major TV and movie commercials by clients including Nissan, Casio, Lufthansa, Honda, and Lexus. The Bermans' movie and soundtrack division landed several songs in top-10 US blockbuster movies including Miss Congeniality featuring Sandra Bullock, Parent Trap featuring Lindsay Lohan  as well as TV series like House and The Sopranos.

References

External links
 https://web.archive.org/web/20070809175626/http://www.discogs.com/artist/Berman%2BBrothers%2C%2BThe The Berman Brothers on Discogs including Discography
  The Berman Brothers on Albumcredits.com  including Discography
 http://www.answers.com/topic/the-berman-brothers?cat=entertainment Answers.com
 http://online.wsj.com/articles/soul-classics-get-a-samba-flavor-1403237768 Wall Street Journal Article about Studio Rio
http://www.huffingtonpost.com/mike-ragogna/chats-with-ivan-neville-a_b_5569338.html  Huffington Post Interview Berman Brothers

German songwriters
German record producers
German musical duos
Male musical duos
Sibling musical duos
Living people
Year of birth missing (living people)